Professor Joseph Henry is an outdoor bronze sculpture by William Wetmore Story, depicting Joseph Henry, located in front of Washington, D.C.'s Smithsonian Institution Building, in the United States. The sculpture is nine feet tall, with a base made from Maine red granite and Quincy gray granite. It was modeled in 1881, cast the following year, and dedicated on April 19, 1883.

See also
 List of public art in Washington, D.C., Ward 2

References

External links
 

1883 sculptures
Bronze sculptures in Washington, D.C.
Monuments and memorials in Washington, D.C.
Outdoor sculptures in Washington, D.C.
Sculptures of men in Washington, D.C.
Statues in Washington, D.C.
Southwest Federal Center